A Perfect Crime is a 2020 German docuseries released on Netflix on September 25, 2020. It centers on German politician Detlev Karsten Rohwedder, head of the Treuhandanstalt, who was assassinated at his home in Düsseldorf on April 1, 1991.

Story
A Perfect Crime is a story described as Germany’s version of the assassination of JFK. In 1991, Detlev Karsten Rohwedder, the man given the unenviable task of privatizing state-run businesses in the former East Germany, was assassinated in his home in an affluent Dusseldorf neighborhood. The case was never solved, and this four-part series examines the story and tries to uncover the mystery.

Cast
 Alfred Hartung as Günther Classen
 Tobias Kasimirowicz as Gerd Korinthenberg
 Beate Malkus as Birgit Hogefeld

Notable interviewees
 Peter Bachsleitner, Rohwedder's chief of staff
 Hero Brahms, vice-president of the Treuhandanstalt
 Günther Classen, crime reporter, Düsseldorfer Express
 Peter-Michael Diestel, deputy Prime Minister and Minister of the Interior, GDR (April–October 1990)
 Willi Fundermann, spokesman for the German Federal Criminal Police Office (Bundeskriminalamt, BKA)
 Rainer Hofmeyer, head of the counter-terrorism section, BKA
 Christian "Flake" Lorenz, member of Neue Deutsche Härte band Rammstein, native of East Berlin
 Christa Luft, deputy Prime Minister and Minister of Economics, GDR (November 1989–March 1990)
 Winfried Ridder, expert on the Red Army Faction (RAF), Federal Office for the Protection of the Constitution
 Silke Maier-Witt, former member of the RAF, involved in kidnapping and murder of Hanns Martin Schleyer in 1977
 Thilo Sarrazin, economist, Ministry of Finance, West Germany/unified Germany
 Lutz Taufer, former member of the RAF, involved in West German Embassy siege in Stockholm in 1975
 Theo Waigel, Minister of Finance, West Germany/unified Germany (1989–98)

Episodes

References

External links
 
 

2020 German television series debuts
2020 German television series endings
German-language Netflix original programming
Netflix original documentary television series
Documentary television series about crime
Documentary television series about politics